The masked puffer (Arothron diadematus) is a pufferfish in the family Tetraodontidae.

Distribution
Red Sea only.

Description
Maximum length 30 cm, olive-green/grey with a black mask over the eyes and pectoral fins, mouth has a black border. Usually solitary but schools during mating period. Some authors believe this to be a variation of the species Arothron nigropunctatus.

Habitat
Associated with coral reefs, from surface to 20m depth.

Gallery

References

External links
 

Arothron
Fish of the Red Sea
Fish described in 1829